Alexis Lopez may refer to:

Alexis López (rower), Mexican rower
Alexis López (field hockey), Uruguayan field hockey player
Alexis López (athlete), Colombian athlete 
American Idol (season 1) contestant